The TSF Ditzingen is an association football club in Germany. It is located in the city of Ditzingen, in Baden-Wurttemberg.

History
The club was formed on 2 July 1893 under the name of TV Ditzingen. However, it did not have a football department until 1920. The club changed its name in 1919 to TSVgg Ditzingen after a merger.

The club existed for most of its life as an undistinguished amateur club, lingering in the lower divisions of Württemberg football. The club fluctuated between Kreisklasse A and Kreisklasse B in those years, the local fifth and sixth division. Only in 1950 could it briefly gain entry to the tier-four 2nd Amateurliga.

It began its rise to prominence in the mid-1980s when a couple of quick promotions took the TSF from the tier-eight Kreisliga B to the tier-three Amateuroberliga Baden-Württemberg in 1991. One of the players in this team was Fredi Bobic, who later played for Germany internationally. Bobic was the Oberliga Baden-Württemberg top-scorer in 1991–92, playing for the TSF, with 19 goals.

In 1993, the club managed to win the Württemberg Cup, beating SV Böblingen 3–2 in the final. This allowed the TSF to take part in the 1993–94 DFB-Pokal, where it lost to Hansa Rostock 0–2 in the second round.

In three seasons in the Oberliga, the club did well enough to qualify for the new Regionalliga Süd, which was formed in 1994. Initially, in this new league, Ditzingen performed well, too, finishing 6th and 5th in its first two seasons. In the 1994–95 season, Sean Dundee scored 24 goals for the team and came second in the Regionalliga scorer list.

From 1996, the club declined however, having to struggle against relegation instead. When, in 2000, the number of Regionalligas was reduced from four to two, the TSF failed to make the cut, having finished only 15th in the league.

With the end of the club's "miracle" rise, it was handed down through the Oberliga within two seasons to the Verbandsliga. After 2008, the club went into free fall, suffering three consecutive relegations and ending up in the tier-nine Kreisliga A Enns/Murr in 2011–12. It won promotion back to the Bezirksliga for a season but was relegated back down to the Kreisliga A in 2013 and the Kreisliga B in 2015. Ditzingen went up to the Kreisliga A the next year but came down again after the season, becoming a yo-yo club.

Honours
The club's honours:

League
 Verbandsliga Württemberg (IV)
 Champions: 1991
 Landesliga Württemberg I (V)
 Champions: 1990
 Bezirksliga Enz-Murr (VI)
 Champions: 1988

Cup
 Württemberg Cup
 Winners: 1993
 Runners-up: 1994

Recent seasons
The recent season-by-season performance of the club:

 With the introduction of the Regionalligas in 1994 and the 3. Liga in 2008 as the new third tier, below the 2. Bundesliga, all leagues below dropped one tier.

References

External links
 Official team site
 Abseits Guide to German Soccer – TSF Ditzingen
 TSF Ditzingen profile at Weltfussball.de
Das deutsche Fußball-Archiv historical German domestic league tables 

Football clubs in Germany
Football clubs in Baden-Württemberg
Association football clubs established in 1920
Sports clubs established in 1893
1893 establishments in Germany